Stuck is a 5-part BBC Two situation comedy series, created and written by Dylan Moran, and co-starring Moran and Morgana Robinson.

Synopsis
Dark and surreal relationship comedy about a couple at a crossroads in life, and, with Dan made redundant and Carla much younger and wanting a family, possibly with each other.

Cast

Dylan Moran as Dan
Morgana Robinson as Carla
Juliet Cowan as Joy
Clemens Schick as Kurt
Neil Maskell as Dr Pete Cosmos

Episodes

Broadcast
An initial broadcast date of 8 September 2022 was delayed due to the death on that day of Queen Elizabeth II. The series was then made available on the BBC iPlayer in the UK on 26 September 2022, alongside a double bill on BBC Two.

Reception
The Independent saw some charming moments but described it as "vapidly inoffensive", comparing it to Moran's previous show Black Books and his character's combination of "world-weary cynicism with a skittish energy". Barbara Ellen in The Guardian comments on the surrealism and says "Stuck meanders, and the jokes, while smart and spiky, feel rationed, but there’s much to enjoy in its wayward, woozy approach". Lucy Mangan in the same publication gave the show 5 stars, saying "...For those of us who love nothing more than comedy vignettes into which both the fleeting pleasures of life and its enduring melancholy have been distilled – well, you're going to want to smash your face into it as if it were a plateful of deliciously moist cake". The Financial Times said "Stuck has the feel of an old-fashioned domestic sitcom... But there is a deeper seam of melancholy in its portrait of two people for whom life hasn't panned out in the way they hoped and who lack the oomph to do anything about it", commenting that "Moran radiates the ennui of a man who has been left behind by the world... not much happens, which is deliberate since the series hinges on the drabness of their existence. As such, Stuck is the kind of show that will provoke wry smiles rather than hoots of laughter".

References

External websites

English-language television shows
2022 British television series debuts
2022 British television series endings
BBC television sitcoms
2020s British sitcoms